Santa Madre Cassino is the debut studio album by the Brazilian band Matanza released in 2001.

Track listing
"Ela Roubou Meu Caminhão" (She Stole My Truck) - 03:45
"Mesa de Saloon" (Saloon Table) - 03:15
"Eu Não Bebo Mais" (I Don't Drink Anymore) - 02:55
"E Tudo Vai Ficar Pior" (And Everything is Gonna Get Worse) - 02:46
"Tombstone City" - 01:57
"Rio de Whisky" (River of Whiskey ) - 03:03
"Quanto Mais Feio" (How Much Uglier) - 03:27
"Ye Ole Bluegrass Assassinate" - 02:22
"Santanico (part 1)" - 03:27
"Santanico (part 2)" - 01:22
"Mais Um Dia Por Aqui" (One More Day Around Here) - 03:00
"Imbecil" (Imbecile) - 01:35
"As Melhores Putas do Alabama" (The Best Whores of Alabama) - 01:34
"Santa Madre Cassino" - 02:47

2002 albums
Matanza (band) albums